Thomas & Friends (also known as Thomas the Tank Engine or The Railway Series) is a media franchise created by Rev. W. Awdry and Britt Allcroft. The franchise revolves around a railway, called the North Western Railway, located on the fictional Island of Sodor. The current title character of the franchise is Thomas the Tank Engine, an anthropomorphised steam locomotive, who works with other engines, including Edward, Henry, Gordon, James, Percy, Toby and many others. The franchise began with stories told from Wilbert Awdry to his son. In 1984, it was turned into a television series, which spawned a reboot series, titled Thomas & Friends: All Engines Go.

Origins of Thomas and Friends 

The first origins of the franchise date back to 1942. When two-year-old Christopher Awdry had caught measles and was confined to a darkened room, his father would tell him stories and rhymes to cheer him up. One of Christopher's favorite rhymes was:Down at the station,
Early in the morning,
All the little engines
Standing in a row.

Along comes the driver,
Pulls the little lever
Puff, puff! Chuff, chuff!
Off we go!The words, with some slight alterations, were later set to music by Lee Ricks and Slim Gaillard in 1948, and released by Tommy Dorsey and his orchestra as a single entitled "Down by the Station". Wilbert Awdry's answers to Christopher's questions about the rhyme led to the creation of a short story, "Edward's Day Out". This told the story of Edward the Blue Engine, an old engine who is allowed out of the shed for a day. Another story about Edward followed, which this time also featured a character called Gordon the Big Engine, named after a child living on the same road who Christopher considered rather bossy.

A third story had its origins in a limerick of which Christopher was fond, and which Awdry used to introduce The Sad Story of Henry:Once, an engine attached to a train
Was afraid of a few drops of rain
It went into a tunnel,
And squeaked through its funnel
And never came out again.

Books 
Wilbert Awdry began publishing these into books. The first was The Three Railway Engines. The second was Thomas the Tank Engine, which introduced Thomas, now the most popular Railway Series character. The third was James the Red Engine, which featured James, a red engine who went on to be common in the TV series. Rev W. Awdry later went on to publish 23 more books.

Awdry continued working on The Railway Series until 1972, when Tramway Engines (book 26 in the series) was published. However, he had been finding it increasingly difficult to come up with ideas for new stories, and after this he felt that "the well had run dry" and so decided that the time had come to retire. He wrote no further Railway Series volumes, but later wrote a spin-off story for the television series named Thomas's Christmas Party and expanded versions of some of his earlier stories, as well as writing The Island of Sodor: Its People, History and Railways. In addition, he wrote a number of short stories and articles for Thomas the Tank Engine Annuals.

Television series (1984–present) 
 Thomas & Friends (original series, 1984–2021)
 Thomas & Friends: All Engines Go (2D-animated reboot series, 2021–present)

Early attempts at adaptation 
Many attempts to create a show based on The Railway Series had been in development since 1953, when Eric Marriott was approached by the BBC to adapt two stories based on the Railway Series stories. During the broadcast of The Sad Story of Henry, the engine used in the broadcast fell and was picked up by a hand seconds later. Models moved jerkily, and all effects, music and sound had to be superimposed.

Later, in 1973, Andrew Lloyd Webber, who had read The Railway Series as a child, approached publisher Kaye & Ward with a proposal for his own musical television series, with songs from himself and lyricist Peter Reeves. However, the publishers and the author refused to give Lloyd Webber's company "control of almost everything", which Lloyd Webber's lawyers argued was necessary in order to "secure the investment money from America which would be needed to pay for the animation and the film-making." The status of the project seemed uncertain, and while Stanley Pickard, Kaye & Ward's managing director at the time, told Awdry that he was "maintaining personal contact with Andrew and still had a slight hope that there might be a way out", Wilbert remained apprehensive, saying that "Once the Americans get hold of it the whole series would be vulgarized and ruined." Eventually, an agreement was reached and Awdry received an advanced payment of £500. A pilot episode was commissioned from Granada, which would feature 2D cutouts of the engines moving along a background in a style reminiscent of Ivor the Engine, with involvement from animator Brian Cosgrove. The cutouts and backgrounds would be based upon illustrations from The Railway Series. The pilot episode was completed by early 1976, but Granada ultimately decided not to produce a full series, as they feared that at the time Awdry's stories were not popular enough outside the UK to justify investing the time and money needed to make the series. Andrew Lloyd Webber later established the Really Useful Group in 1977, a name derived from the phrase "Really Useful Engine". He would go on to work on a musical loosely inspired by The Railway Series, called Starlight Express, which premiered in 1984, and became one of his most well-known works.

Early years and the series' success 

In 1979, British television producer Britt Allcroft was producing a documentary on the Bluebell Railway, a heritage railway in Sussex which featured in the Railway Series book Stepney the Bluebell Engine. As part of her research before filming, Allcroft read some books in The Railway Series and was highly entertained and impressed with the stories which Awdry had written, later remarking that "there was something in the stories that I felt I could develop that would connect with children. I saw a strong emotional content that would carry with little children's experiences with life."

Allcroft worked to convince Awdry that she could, with funding, convert the stories into a successful television show. Her efforts were successful, and she purchased the television rights from the publishers of The Railway Series at a cost of what was then £50,000 ($74,000 in U.S. dollars at the time). Allcroft still had to work to raise the money to finance production and, despite showing a keen interest, wanted a level of creative control which she did not want to forego. In the end, after several years of searching and having to place a second mortgage on her home, Allcroft raised sufficient funding from her local bank manager. 

By 1981, Allcroft had secured the finances to produce the show, she started to assemble the crew, including producer and director David Mitton, also the founder of Clearwater Features Ltd.; crew member Steve Asquith; American-born producer Robert D. Cardona; and composers and songwriters Mike O'Donnell and Junior Campbell, who are also musicians.

Spin-off 
In 2002, a spin-off titled Jack and the Sodor Construction Company was in the works. Although the series was cancelled, most likely due to its similarity to Bob the Builder, 13 episodes had already been filmed. Twenty-six episodes had originally been planned in 2001, and the remaining 13 episodes that were yet to be filmed at the time were the ones cancelled. Two of the episodes apart from the planned twenty-six, Jack Jumps In and A Friend in Need, were adapted into the sixth season of the show, and paired as one episode, as 2002 was the year the sixth season aired. In 2006, the 13 episodes that had already been filmed were revived into a spin-off with the same recurring name as the original show concocted in 2002. The episodes aired at the same time as the tenth season of the show.

2D-animated reboot series 
In October 2020, Mattel Television formed a new co-production partnership with Corus Entertainment's Nelvana Studio and greenlit two new seasons for the Thomas & Friends series, consisting of 104 11-minute episodes and two hour-long specials. The new episodes were said to be produced using 2D-animation and include more physical comedy and music than before.

In January 2021, it was announced that the new episodes were set to be released as an entirely new television series known as Thomas & Friends: All Engines Go. Executive producer Christopher Keenan stated that it was, "crafted to appeal to contemporary audiences' sensibilities while maintaining Thomas' core brand ethos".

The series serves as a reboot of the original Thomas & Friends series that ran from 1984 to 2021. It was originally set to be a continuation of the original series (with the two seasons labeled as series 25 and 26), but Mattel Television later confirmed it to be a separate series. It introduces "an entirely new approach to Thomas & Friends content," with a new animation style and story structure, therefore receiving widespread backlash from audiences who complained about the new art style and storyline for its lack of faithfulness to its source material. 

Unlike the original series, All Engines Go was developed in North America rather than Europe.

Films and specials

Box office performance

Cast and characters

Commercialisation

Day out with Thomas 

"Day out with Thomas", is a marketing name used by HiT Entertainment for special events held at heritage railways in the UK. The characteristic features of these events include locomotives wearing 'faces' to resemble 'Thomas' characters, and a "Fat Controller" character, usually performed by one of the railway's volunteers. The general idea is that the public have the chance to ride in a train pulled by 'Thomas' or one of his friends.

In the US the name also refers to "Come Ride the Rails with Thomas" which is a US tour by real trains modelled after Thomas the Tank Engine. The Thomas engine visits various historic railroads across the United States allowing visitors to play games, meet Sir Topham Hatt and to ride on a passenger car pulled by the engine. HiT Entertainment sponsors the event to promote the Thomas and Friends brand.

In the Netherlands is also a "Day out with Thomas", Een dag uit met Thomas, and is held at the South Limburg Railway Compagny a heritage railway in Simpelveld in the South of the Netherlands in the province of Limburg. The Thomas locomotive is shipped from the UK. The South Limburg Railway Compagny has its own Diesel locomotive.

Amusement parks 
From 2007 until 2017, Drusilla's Park near Alfriston, Sussex, England opened a railway ride featuring Thomas, Annie and Clarabel. The track ran through the Zoo Park and also featured James, Diesel, Cranky and the Fat Controller.

Since 2007, several Six Flags amusement parks in the US have included Thomas and Friends -themed attractions: Six Flags Discovery Kingdom, Six Flags New England, Six Flags Magic Mountain, Six Flags Over Georgia and Six Flags America. However, in late 2010, Six Flags began the process of removing Non-Warner Bros. licensed theming from its attractions, including Thomas and Friends. Several of these attractions have since been renamed and re-themed.

On 15 March 2008, Drayton Manor in the UK opened their own Thomas Land just like Japan's Amusement Park which attracts 1.7 million fans every year. Thomas Land at Drayton Manor is on the site of what was formerly Robinsons Land.

For the 2008 & 2009 Season, Dutch Wonderland in Lancaster, Pennsylvania, USA, featured a 'Thomas and Friends Live' production.

Merchandise 

Merchandise for the Thomas & Friends franchise has been produced to capitalize on the success of the television series Thomas & Friends (formerly Thomas the Tank Engine and Friends). Whilst merchandise was produced alongside due to the popularity of the first of The Railway Series by the Rev. W. Awdry since 1945, and the original broadcast of the television series in 1984 in the United Kingdom, large numbers of manufacturers have sought to produce Thomas-branded items after the television series was broadcast in the United States and Japan.

The most popular and wide-ranging merchandise are the models of the characters, some including accompanying railway systems. Other popular products include videos, books and magazines, computer games, audiobooks, annuals, colouring and activity books, jigsaws, board games, stationery, clothing, cutlery, household items such as curtains, duvet covers and lampshades, and soft drinks.

Thomas & Friends ranked number one in the preschool toys category in the U.S. and made the top 10 for the entire U.S. toy industry in 2010. In January 2011, Thomas & Friends ranked as the number-one preschool toy property in the U.K. for the 11th year in a row. Thomas is also a top-selling toy property in Australia, Germany, Japan, and Korea. While the total traditional toy industry in the United States increased 1.9 per cent in 2010, overall Thomas & Friends toy sales increased over 47.1 per cent.

Toys 

With the popularity of the Thomas the Tank Engine and Friends TV series among children, Thomas-based merchandise has proven very lucrative. At least 5 different categories of trains and tracks exist: "Take Along Thomas" with grey tracks; TrackMaster battery-operated engines with brown tracks (previously Tomy with blue track); Brio-type wooden engines with wooden rails and roads (by ELC and others); electric model railway (produced in OO gauge by Hornby and Bachmann, N gauge by Tomix, O gauge by Lionel, and (from 2010) G-scale from Bachmann); and Lego engines and tracks. Merit Toys also produced some larger scale battery-powered engines with carriages and wagons in the 1980s, which ran on red tracks. Complementary videos, DVDs, books, games, puzzles, stationery, clothing and household items have also been produced.

From 2015 The "Minis" and "My First Thomas" range started.

In January 1987, a number of Thomas toys were recalled after test found lead content in the paint was up to 90 times the legally permitted level. The toys were imported by ERTL (UK) from China.

Heritage railways 

HiT Entertainment (which, acquired Gullane Entertainment (formerly known as The Britt Allcroft Company) in 2002) and Mattel (which, took over HiT in 2017) licenses "Day out with Thomas" events all over the world, at which visitors to heritage railways can meet and ride on a train hauled by a replica "Thomas".

As none of the E2 Class survived into preservation, various other classes have been adapted to resemble Thomas. Replicas are based on 0-6-0 locomotives such as Hunslet Austerity 0-6-0ST number 3781, which was converted from a saddle-tank to a side-tank design by fabricators of the Mid-Hants Railway to create No. 1 "Thomas" in 1994. The Strasburg Rail Road in Lancaster, PA (USA) built and featured their No. 1 "Thomas" since 1999 in the US and announced their introduction of "Percy, the Small Engine" at the "Day Out With Thomas" event on 13 September 2014.

Due to the increasing licensing fees and many other restrictions imposed by HiT including the need for "Sir Topham Hatts" to have auditions and the requirement for intensive Criminal Records Bureau checking, many heritage railways in the UK and overseas have reluctantly decided to withdraw from running "Thomas" days, thus reducing the income stream to these organisations.

An international tour featuring Thomas and his driver was completed in 2005 in honour of the 60th anniversary of the original stories. Former US President George H. W. Bush dedicated the Presidential Train during a ceremony in 2005.

A "real" Thomas was used in a special play, The Queen's Handbag, staged to celebrate the 80th birthday of Queen Elizabeth II, starring well-loved characters from children's literature. In the play the near life-sized Thomas carried Sophie Dahl to the stage to meet Sir Topham Hatt (Jonathan Ross) at the beginning of the show. The same Thomas had previously been used in the All Aboard Live Tour.

Popularity with autistic audience 
In June and July 2001, the UK National Autistic Society conducted a survey of 81 parents of children with autism and Asperger syndrome to investigate their putative 'special relationship' with Thomas the Tank Engine. The survey confirmed the organisation's assumption from anecdotal evidence that children with autism spectrum disorders associate far more strongly with Thomas the Tank Engine than with other children's characters.

In the National Autistic Society's April 2007 survey, conducted with 748 UK parents of children under 10 with autism, 58% of parents reported Thomas was the first children's character their children enjoyed, with about one-third of parents reporting their children were able to learn basic facial expressions from the characters, as all of Thomas's friends have easy-to-read expressions. 54% of parents reported that the stories contributed to their child's sense of security.

Mattel developed an autistic character for the series, and introduced "Bruno the Brake Car" to appear along with Thomas from 21 September 2022. They worked with organisations including the Autistic Self Advocacy Network and the National Autistic Society, which helped to cast nine year old Elliott Garcia from Reading, Berkshire, to play the voice part of the brake van (or caboose).

References

External links

Official websites 
 
 Awdry Family Site

Other sites 
 

 
Fiction about rail transport
Mass media franchises introduced in 1945